Adilabad Lok Sabha constituency is one of the 17 Lok Sabha (Lower house of the Parliament) constituencies in the state of Telangana, India. This constituency is reserved for the candidates belonging to the Scheduled Tribes.

Assembly segments
This constituency comprises the following Vidhan Sabha (legislative assembly) segments:

Members of Parliament

^ by-poll

Election results

General Election, 2019

General Election, 2014

General Election, 2009

General By-Election, 2008

General Election, 2004

General Election, 1999

Notes
  Number (#) in the Assembly Segments table is the "Assembly Segment" number, not a serial number.

References

External links
Adilabad Lok Sabha Election Results - 2014 to 1971 in Detail
 Adilabad lok sabha  constituency election 2019 date and schedule

See also
 Adilabad district
 List of Constituencies of the Lok Sabha

Adilabad district
Lok Sabha constituencies in Telangana